Cycloramphus faustoi is a species of frog in the family Cycloramphidae. It is endemic to Ilha dos Alcatrazes, a  island about 35 km off the coast of São Paulo state, Brazil.

Description
Adult males measure  and adult females  in snout–vent length. The body is robust. The head is wider than it is long. The snout is truncate and the eyes are protruding. The tympanum is not visible externally (but becomes visible if skin is removed); the supra-tympanic fold is distinct. The fingers and the toes have no webbing nor lateral fringes. The dorsum is dark brown and has a few yellowish or white spots. A narrow light yellow inter-orbital bar is present. The limbs have few white to light yellow bars. The throat is white and has a few brown spots. The belly is immaculate whitish, but some individuals have a few brown spots.

Habitat and conservation
The stream is bordered by Atlantic forest. During the rainy season, the water trickles through this valley. Both males and females were spotted in rock crevices; they were wary and went into hiding when disturbed.

Reproduction seems to occur in August when, following a rainy afternoon, males were heard calling at night and a females found guarding an egg clutch consisting of 31 eggs; the female did not leave even when disturbed.

This species appears to be scarce within its small range. Moreover, its habitat is threatened by fires caused by artillery training activities. Hence, it is listed as "critically endangered" by the International Union for Conservation of Nature (IUCN).

References

faustoi
Endemic fauna of Brazil
Amphibians of Brazil
Amphibians described in 2007